The South Western line is a narrow gauge railway line in the southern part of the state of Queensland, Australia. It junctions from the Southern line immediately south of Warwick station and proceeded westwards for a distance of 413 km to the town of Dirranbandi. A western extension to Boomie in New South Wales, approved by the Queensland Parliament in 1914, was never constructed. The Thallon-to-Dirranbandi section was closed on 2 September 2010.

It services the small towns of Inglewood (junction of the now closed Texas branch) and Goondiwindi as well as the villages of Yelarbon and Thallon among others.

History
The South Western line opened as far as Thane on 1 July 1904 and was completed to Dirranbandi on 21 May 1913. A further extension of the line west of Dirranbandi was approved by Parliament in 1914 but never constructed.

Services
The South Western Mail was introduced as a twice weekly service in 1910. Upon the opening of the line to Dirranbandi, the train departed Brisbane at 20:45, arrived at Warwick 04:00, Goondiwindi 10:00 and Dirranbandi 16:30. The return service departed 11.30, arrived Goondiwindi 17.35, Warwick 23.35 and Brisbane 07.10 the following morning.

The South Western line was the last railway in Australia to be serviced by mail trains.<ref>"The Last of the Mail Trains" Australian Railway Historical Society Bulletin"  July 1990 pages 155-166</ref> The last Dirranbandi Mail'' ran on 11 February 1993.

Passenger services no longer service the South Western line though it is still used for freight as far as Thallon. The line beyond there was extensively damaged in the 2010 floods and was closed on 2 September 2010. Long-distance bus operators Crisps Coaches and Greyhound Australia now serve towns along the route.

Current line standards
The section from Warwick to Goodiwindi is laid with 30, 41 & 47 kg/m rail, 25-50% steel sleepers, a maximum axle load of 15.75 tonnes and a line speed of 80 km/h. The steepest grade on the section is 1 in 44 (~2.3%), and the minimum radius curve is 200m.

The next section to Thallon has similar rail, a 70 km/h line speed to Toobeah, 60 km/h beyond, a maximum grade of 1 in 50 (2%) and minimum 400m radius curves.

The last section to Dirranbandi had 20 kg/m rail, a 10 tonne axle load and 40 km/h line speed.

Consistent with the rest of the Queensland regional railways, the line is narrow gauge.

Gallery

References

External links

1925 map of the Queensland railway system

Darling Downs
Railway lines in Queensland
Railway lines opened in 1904
South West Queensland
1904 establishments in Australia